The second USS Grand Rapids (PGM-98/PG-98) was an  in the United States Navy during the Vietnam War.

On 13 June 1968, the Tacoma Boatbuilding Company, Tacoma, Washington laid down Grand Rapids, the eleventh Asheville-class gunboat built by Tacoma. In August 1968, however, the Tacoma shipyard suffered a severe fire that destroyed the under-construction Grand Rapids (together with sister ship ). A new Grand Rapids, with the same hull number, was laid down again by Thursday Tacoma Boat on 20 May 1969. The ship was launched on 20 December 1969 and commissioned on 5 September 1970.

Grand Rapids was homeported in San Diego and later Naples, Italy,

Grand Rapids was decommissioned on 1 October 1977 and transferred to the Naval Sea Systems Command where she was renamed research vessel Athena II.

In September 2016, Athena II was stricken from the US Navy.

In 2020 the Grand Rapids was listed for sale on Facebook Marketplace for $350,000.

Citations

References

External links
 </ref>

 

1970 ships
Asheville-class gunboats
Ships built by Tacoma Boatbuilding Company